Rosa Diganthe is a 2008 Sri Lankan Sinhala comedy film directed by Suresh Kumarasinghe and produced by Bertrum Jayakody for Nashon Films. It stars Nilanthi Dias and Tharindu Wijesinghe in lead roles along with Manjula Thilini and Rex Kodippili. Music composed by Asela Indralal. It is the 1113rd Sri Lankan film in the Sinhala cinema.

Plot

Cast
 Nilanthi Dias
 Manjula Thilini
 Rex Kodippili
 Tharindu Wijesinghe
 Dayananda Jayawardena
 Premadasa Vithanage
 Teddy Vidyalankara
 Tyrone Michael
 Miyuri Samarasinghe

References

2008 films
2000s Sinhala-language films